Johnny Ward (born 1983) is a Northern Irish entrepreneur, adventurer, philanthropist and travel blogger known for visiting every country in the world.

Early life and education
Ward was born in Galway, Ireland in 1983 to a single mother named Maura. His family moved to Kilkeel, Northern Ireland soon after, and Ward largely grew up there. His family often subsisted on welfare during his childhood. Ward studied international economics at university in England, graduating in 2006.

Travel and career
After graduating from university in 2006, Ward began to travel. He initially flew to New York City and worked as a summer camp counselor in the United States for a brief period. He returned to Ireland and took part in a medical research experiment to earn more money to travel. He then travelled to Thailand where he taught English for a year before moving to Sydney, where he worked as a telephone sales representative.

Dissatisfied with office work, Ward left his job and sought to make a living from travelling full-time. In 2010, Ward started a blog named "OneStep4Ward" to document his travels. By the end of that year, he was reportedly earning an average of $40,000 per month, working around 10 hours per week from his laptop to manage his staff and run a portfolio of websites. During this period, Ward based himself in Bangkok, Thailand, and also began investing in property.

By August 2012, Ward had visited over 80 countries, and over 100 countries by the end of that year. In 2014, Ward was a founding member of the Professional Travel Bloggers Association, and on several occasions in that period, sources have identified OneStep4Ward as a top travel blog. By 2015, he had earned a total of around $1 million and had visited 152 countries. Over the course of his travels, Ward "broke an ankle in Korea, his leg in Thailand, [and] had been in hospital about 20 times". Ward has recounted entering several countries through questionable or illegal means; it was reported that he "entered China illegally after a five-day trip up the Mekong River while stowed away in a cargo boat", that he was arrested after paying a smuggler to take him from Liberia to Ivory Coast during the Ebola epidemic, and that he was able to enter Yemen during an ongoing civil war by meeting a dignitary who "bribed Yemeni officials and I ended up hitching there on a cement cargo ship". Shortly after arriving in Angola, Ward witnessed a person being shot only a few metres away from his taxi cab, which quickly left the scene.

In 2017, Ward visited his 197th and final nation, Norway, chosen because its proximity to Ireland made it convenient for friends and family to join him for the occasion.

Adventurer 
Ward has since declared his intention to be the first person to visit every country, plus visit the North Pole, South Pole, and climb all of the Seven Summits. He has since finished 8th in the North Pole Marathon, and summited Africa's highest peak, Mount Kilimanjaro, Australasia's highest peak, Puncak Jaya, South America's highest peak, Aconcagua, North America's highest peak, Denali, and Europe's highest peak, Mount Elbrus. Alongside this, Ward has also completed multiple long-distance ultra-marathons ranging from 100 km to 260 km, and competed in the Marathon des Sables in 2019.

Ward rowed across the Atlantic Ocean in March, April, and May 2021.

Blog
Ward started his travel blog, OneStep4Ward.com, in 2010 whilst living in Australia, and soon began making a full-time income blogging. His blog is often listed as Ireland's leading blog, and one of the world's leading travel blogs.

Ward was nominated for the 11th Shorty Awards, the 'Oscars for Social Media' for 'Best in Travel'

Awards and nominations

Philanthropy
Ward co-founded the non-profit Mudita Adventures (formally the Giveback GiveAway) in 2015 with a view to 'Change Travel. For Good.' Since then, Mudita Adventures has built schools, dormitories, playgrounds and clinics for developing communities in 10 countries, donating over $200,000USD.

In 2019, Ward helped his mother, who had previously been diagnosed with Parkinson's disease, raise £14,444 to climb Mount Fuji in Japan, with the funds going towards the Cure Parkinson's Trust.

In Quarter one of 2021, Ward rowed across the Atlantic Ocean, spending 51 days on a rowboat on a meat-free expedition. Raising over $20,000 for men's mental health and animal rights.

In November 2021, Ward took a group of people, including his mother once more, to partake in the Serengeti Marathon in Tanzania, raising $16,000 (£14,000) for the Michael J. Fox Foundation to help find a cure for Parkinson's Disease.

References

External links
 

1983 births
Living people
People from County Galway
Irish travel writers
21st-century travel writers